William Weare may refer to:

William Weare, victim in the Radlett murder
William Weare alias Browne, MP for Calne (UK Parliament constituency)